Pukkoya Thangal, full P. M. S. A. Pukkoya Thangal (died 1975), of the Pukkoya family of Panakkad, south Malabar, was an Indian sayyid (thangal) community leader and Indian Union Muslim League politician from Kerala. He served as the Kerala State President, Indian Union Muslim League and the President, Samastha Kerala Jam'iyyat al-'Ulama' (the body of Sunni-Shafi'i scholars in Kerala).

The thangal was born in the Yemeni-origin Pukkoya family of northern Kerala.

Pukkoya Thangal was succeeded by his eldest son Syed Muhammed Ali Shihab Thangal (1936 - 2009).

References 

1975 deaths
1913 births
Malayali politicians
Mappilas
People from Malappuram
Islam in Kerala
Indian Union Muslim League politicians
Kerala politicians
Kerala Sunni-Shafi'i scholars
Indian Sunni Muslims